The Levant Schooner Flotilla was an Allied naval organisation during World War II that facilitated covert and irregular military operations in the Aegean Sea from 1942–1945. It was primarily organised by the British Royal Navy and consisted of a series of commandeered caïques, or local schooners, manned by British sailors, special forces, and Greek volunteers.

World War II in the Aegean

The Levant Schooner Flotilla (LSF) was formed by the Royal Navy from requisitioned or abandoned caïques to supplement its handful of motor and high-speed launches opposing German forces in the Nazi-occupied Aegean Sea. The LSF was led by Lt. Cmdr. Adrian C. C. Seligman, who had circumnavigated the globe in a windjammer before the war. The Flotilla numbered about ten ships in September 1943, though at various points it was able to field only a handful. Caïques typically had 5–6 man crews and were heavily armed with 20mm cannons, Browning machine guns and Vickers aircraft machine guns. The caïques often operated under cover of darkness, landing or picking up commandos, rescuing partisans, and intercepting or raiding small German forces. Many of the ships were powered by Matilda tank engines and used long-range radios taken from Kittyhawk (P-40) fighter aircraft.

The LSF facilitated raids by the British Long Range Desert Group against German forces on the Islands of Kithnos and Levitha during the Dodecanese Campaign in the autumn of 1943, and was heavily involved in fighting over Leros shortly thereafter. Among those who served in the LSF are Roger Durnford and British scholar Geoffrey Kirk.

See also
Military history of Greece during World War II
Mediterranean Theater of Operations

External links
Allied Special Forces History: Levant Schooner Flotilla

Notes

1940s in Greece
Mediterranean theatre of World War II
Military history of Greece during World War II
Dodecanese campaign
Military units and formations of the Royal Navy in World War II
History of the Hellenic Navy